In applied mathematics – specifically in fuzzy logic – the ordered weighted averaging (OWA) operators provide a parameterized class of mean type aggregation operators. They were introduced by Ronald R. Yager. Many notable mean operators such as the max, arithmetic average, median and min, are members of this class. They have been widely used in computational intelligence because of their ability to model linguistically expressed aggregation instructions.

Definition 

Formally an OWA operator of dimension  is a mapping  that has an associated collection of weights  lying in the unit interval and summing to one and with 		

By choosing different W one can implement different aggregation operators. The OWA operator is a non-linear operator as a result of the process of determining the bj.

Properties 

The OWA operator is a mean operator. It is bounded, monotonic, symmetric, and idempotent, as defined below.

Notable OWA operators 

 if  for all

Characterizing features 

Two features have been used to characterize the OWA operators. The first is the attitudinal character(orness).

This is defined as

It is known that .

In addition A − C(max) = 1, A − C(ave) = A − C(med) = 0.5 and A − C(min) = 0. Thus the A − C goes from 1 to 0 as we go from Max to Min aggregation. The attitudinal character characterizes the similarity of aggregation to OR operation(OR is defined as the Max).

The second feature is the dispersion. This defined as

An alternative definition is  The dispersion characterizes how uniformly the arguments are being used
ÀĚ

Type-1 OWA aggregation operators 

The above Yager's OWA operators are used to aggregate the crisp values. Can we aggregate fuzzy sets in the OWA mechanism ? The
Type-1 OWA operators have been proposed for this purpose. So the type-1 OWA operators provides us with a new technique for directly aggregating uncertain information with uncertain weights via OWA mechanism in soft decision making and data mining, where these uncertain objects are modelled by fuzzy sets.

The type-1 OWA operator is defined according to the alpha-cuts of fuzzy sets as follows:

Given the n linguistic weights  in the form of fuzzy sets defined on the domain of discourse , then for each , an -level type-1 OWA operator with -level sets  to aggregate the -cuts of fuzzy sets  is given as

 

element in the set .

The computation of the type-1 OWA output is implemented by computing the left end-points and right end-points of the intervals :
 and 
where . Then membership function of resulting aggregation fuzzy set is:

For the left end-points, we need to solve the following programming problem:

while for the right end-points, we need to solve the following programming problem:

This paper has presented a fast method to solve two programming problem so that the type-1 OWA aggregation operation can be performed efficiently.

References 

 Yager, R. R., "On ordered weighted averaging aggregation operators in multi-criteria decision making," IEEE Transactions on Systems, Man and Cybernetics 18, 183–190, 1988.
 Yager, R. R. and Kacprzyk, J., The Ordered Weighted Averaging Operators: Theory and Applications, Kluwer: Norwell, MA, 1997.
 Liu, X., "The solution equivalence of minimax disparity and minimum variance problems for OWA operators," International Journal of Approximate Reasoning 45, 68–81, 2007.
 Torra, V. and Narukawa, Y., Modeling Decisions: Information Fusion and Aggregation Operators, Springer: Berlin, 2007.
 Majlender, P., "OWA operators with maximal Rényi entropy," Fuzzy Sets and Systems 155, 340–360, 2005.
 Szekely, G. J. and Buczolich, Z., " When is a weighted average of ordered sample elements a maximum likelihood estimator of the location parameter?" Advances in Applied Mathematics 10, 1989, 439–456.
 S.-M. Zhou, F. Chiclana, R. I. John and J. M. Garibaldi, "Type-1 OWA operators for aggregating uncertain information with uncertain weights induced by type-2 linguistic quantifiers," Fuzzy Sets and Systems, Vol.159, No.24, pp. 3281–3296, 2008 
 S.-M. Zhou, F. Chiclana, R. I. John and J. M. Garibaldi, "Alpha-level aggregation: a practical approach to type-1 OWA operation for aggregating uncertain information with applications to breast cancer treatments," IEEE Transactions on Knowledge and Data Engineering, vol. 23, no.10, 2011, pp. 1455–1468.
 S.-M. Zhou, R. I. John, F. Chiclana and J. M. Garibaldi, "On aggregating uncertain information by type-2 OWA operators for soft decision making," International Journal of Intelligent Systems, vol. 25, no.6, pp. 540–558, 2010.

Logic in computer science
Fuzzy logic
Information retrieval techniques